New Jersey's 40th Legislative District is one of 40 districts that make up the map for the New Jersey Legislature.

Demographic information
As of the 2020 United States census, the district had a population of 218,353, of whom 172,104 (78.8%) were of voting age. The racial makeup of the district was 166,763 (76.4%) White, 5,141 (2.4%) African American, 455 (0.2%) Native American, 18,320 (8.4%) Asian, 39 (0.0%) Pacific Islander, 9,672 (4.4%) from some other race, and 17,963 (8.2%) from two or more races. Hispanic or Latino of any race were 27,178 (12.4%) of the population.

The district had 175,482 registered voters , of whom 66,134 (37.7%) were registered as unaffiliated, 56,254 (32.1%) were registered as Republicans, 51,594 (29.4%) were registered as Democrats, and 1,500 (0.9%) were registered to other parties.

Political representation
For the 2022–2023 session, the district is represented in the State Senate by Kristin Corrado (R, Totowa) and in the General Assembly by Christopher DePhillips (R, Wyckoff) and  Kevin J. Rooney (R, Wyckoff).

The legislative district overlaps with New Jersey's 5th, New Jersey's 9th, and 11th congressional districts.

District composition since 1973
Upon the creation of the 40-district legislative map in 1973, the 40th District consisted of western Bergen County running from Elmwood Park north along the county line to Ridgewood, then in addition to Ho-Ho-Kus and Midland Park, consisted of the larger municipalities in the northwest corner of the county. Following the 1981 redistricting, the 40th lost Elmwood Park, Ho-Ho-Kus, and Allendale, but picked up Upper Saddle River and the Passaic County boroughs of North Haledon, Pompton Lakes, Bloomingdale, and Wanaque. In the 1991 redistricting, Ramsey, Upper Saddle River, North Haledon, Pompton Lakes, and Bloomingdale were shifted to other districts, but Washington Township, Waldwick, Ringwood, and West Milford became a part of the district. Under the 2001 redistricting, the Bergen County portion of the 40th District became smaller only running along the county border from Ridgewood to Mahwah (plus Midland Park), but in addition to Ringwood and Wanaque, passed through the center of the county picking up Wayne and Little Falls and for the first time included Essex County by encompassing Cedar Grove and Verona. Mahwah and Oakland were eliminated from the Bergen County portion in the 2011 redistricting but Allendale, Ho-Ho-Kus, and Waldwick were added, more of central Passaic County was added including Totowa and Woodland Park, and Morris County's Pequannock were included within the district.

Since 1973, the district has always leaned Republican, never electing a Democrat through the 2019 general election. It is one of only nine state legislative districts statewide that has never elected more than one political party to Trenton, and with the election of a Democrat to the 16th in 2015, the only district to have elected only Republicans.

Senator Corrado has served the district since October 2017. Previously the Clerk of Passaic County, she was appointed to replace three-term incumbent Kevin J. O'Toole of Cedar Grove, after his appointment to the Board of Commissioners of The Port Authority of New York and New Jersey.

Assemblyman Rooney has served the district since December 2016, the longest serving of the three in the district. The former mayor of Wyckoff, New Jersey was appointed to replace multi-term incumbent Scott Rumana of Wayne after his appointment to the bench of the Superior Court of New Jersey.

Assemblyman DePhillips, a former mayor of Wyckoff, is the newest of the three in office, serving in the district since January 2018. First elected in 2017, DePhillips replaced David C. Russo of Ridgewood, who was first elected in 1989 and served until he left office in 2018 after his fourteenth term.

Election history

Election results

Senate

General Assembly

References

Bergen County, New Jersey
Essex County, New Jersey
Morris County, New Jersey
Passaic County, New Jersey
40